Michael Joseph Pazik (born January 26, 1950) is an American former Major League Baseball pitcher. He pitched parts of three seasons in the majors, from  until , for the Minnesota Twins.

Amateur career
A native of Lynn, Massachusetts, Pazik graduated from Lynn English High School in 1968, and was selected by the Los Angeles Dodgers in the 4th round of the 1968 MLB Draft. He opted to play college baseball at the College of the Holy Cross. In 1968 and 1969, Pazik played collegiate summer baseball with the Harwich Mariners of the Cape Cod Baseball League (CCBL) and was named a league all-star in 1969. He returned to the CCBL in 1970 and 1971 to play for the Orleans Cardinals, tossing a no-hitter in 1971.

Professional career

Pazik was selected by the New York Yankees in the first round of the 1971 MLB Draft. He played for the Yankees' minor league affiliate Syracuse Chiefs for several seasons before being traded to the Minnesota Twins for Dick Woodson in 1974. He made his big league debut for Minnesota in 1975, and pitched a total of 46.2 innings for the Twins over three seasons. Pazik signed as a free agent with the Chicago White Sox in 1978, and played two seasons in Chicago's minor league system, but was not recalled to the majors.

Coaching and scouting career
After his playing career, Pazik was a minor league coach and manager, including serving as the pitching coach for the Chicago White Sox from  until . He also served as a scout for Kansas City Royals during their 2015 World Series winning season.

Personal
Mike's daughter, Kristen Pazik, is a model who is married to Ukrainian former football player turned manager Andriy Shevchenko.

References

External links
, or Retrosheet

1950 births
Living people
American people of Polish descent
Baseball players from Massachusetts
Chicago White Sox coaches
Chicago White Sox scouts
College of the Holy Cross alumni
Fort Lauderdale Yankees players
Harwich Mariners players
Holy Cross Crusaders baseball players
Iowa Oaks players
Kansas City Royals scouts
Knoxville Sox players
Major League Baseball pitchers
Major League Baseball pitching coaches
Minnesota Twins players
Minor league baseball coaches
Minor league baseball managers
Orleans Firebirds players
Petroleros de Zulia players
Portland Beavers players
Sportspeople from Lynn, Massachusetts
Syracuse Chiefs players
Tacoma Twins players
Tigres de Aragua players
American expatriate baseball players in Venezuela